Janusz Kazimierz Kaczmarek (born 25 December 1961 in Gdynia) is a Polish lawyer, prosecutor and politician. He was National Public Prosecutor from 31 October 2005 to 8 February 2007, and Polish Minister of Internal Affairs and Administration from 8 February 2007 to 8 August 2007.

He graduated from the Faculty of Law and Administration of the Gdańsk University.

His term as interior minister in Jarosław Kaczyński's  cabinet ended abruptly when he was dismissed because the accusations of warning Andrzej Lepper about an impending action of the Central Anticorruption Bureau action. Since then Kaczmarek has repeatedly criticized the government, especially Justice Minister Zbigniew Ziobro.

On 30 August 2007 Kaczmarek was detained for 48 hours on allegations of hampering the investigation and submitting false testimonies. Some observers in the Polish press initially regarded this arrest as a political dirty trick intended to silence critics of the Kaczynski government. However, on the press conference on 31 August 2007, prosecutors presented evidence supporting the charges presented to Kaczmarek.

On 6 September 2007 a Warsaw criminal court declared that the 30 August arrest of Kaczmarek was not necessary and irregularly made, although did not undermine the charges against him.

References

 01.09.2007, Kaczmarek skłamał - obejrzyj nagrania z hotelowych kamer, TVN24
 06.09.2007, Sąd: Zatrzymanie Kaczmarka bezzasadne i nieprawidłowe, TVN24

1961 births
Living people
People from Gdynia
Polish prosecutors
Polish United Workers' Party members
Law and Justice politicians
University of Gdańsk alumni
Interior ministers of Poland